Cananga odorata, known as ylang-ylang or cananga tree, is a tropical tree that is native to and originated in the Philippines and spread to Malaysia, Indonesia, New Guinea, the Solomon Islands, and Queensland, Australia. It is also native to parts of Cambodia, Thailand and Vietnam. It is valued for the essential oils extracted from its flowers (also called "ylang-ylang"), which has a strong floral fragrance. Ylang-ylang is one of the most extensively used natural materials in the perfume industry, earning it the name "Queen of Perfumes".

The ylang-ylang vine (Artabotrys odoratissimus) and climbing ylang-ylang (Artabotrys hexapetalus) are woody, evergreen climbing plants in the same family. Artabotrys odoratissimus is also a source of perfume.

Etymology and nomenclature
The name ylang-ylang is the Spanish spelling of the Tagalog term for the tree,  - a reduplicative form of the word , meaning "wilderness", alluding to the tree's natural habitat. A common mistranslation is "flower of flowers".

The tree is also called the fragrant cananga, Macassar-oil plant, or perfume tree. It is called kenanga in Malay, from Proto-Malayo-Polynesian *kanaŋa. Its traditional Polynesian names include Mataoi (Cook Islands), Mohokoi (Tonga), Mosooi (Samoa), Motooi (Hawaii), and Mokosoi, Mokasoi or Mokohoi (Fiji).

Description

Cananga odorata is a fast-growing tree of the custard apple family Annonaceae. Leaflets are oval, pointed and with wavy margins. The flower is drooping, long-stalked, with six narrow, greenish-yellow (rarely pink) petals, rather like a sea star in appearance, and yields a highly fragrant essential oil. Its pollen is shed as permanent tetrads.

Cananga odorata var. fruticosa, dwarf ylang-ylang, grows as small tree or compact shrub.

Distribution and habitat
The plant is native to the Malesian ecoregion, from parts of Mainland Southeast Asia (Thailand and Vietnam), to Maritime Southeast Asia (the Philippines, Malaysia, Indonesia), Papua New Guinea, the Solomon Islands, and to Queensland, Australia. It has been introduced to other tropical regions in the Pacific Islands, South Asia, Africa, and the Americas. It is commonly grown in Madagascar, Polynesia, Melanesia, Micronesia, and the Comoros Islands. It grows in full or partial sun, and prefers the acidic soils of its native rainforest habitat. Ylang-ylang has been cultivated in temperate climates under conservatory conditions.

In Madagascar, it is grown in plantations with Hewittia malabarica  as a groundcover plant.

Ecology
Its clusters of black fruit are an important food item for birds, such as the collared imperial pigeon, purple-tailed imperial pigeon, Zoe's imperial pigeon, superb fruit dove, pink-spotted fruit dove, coroneted fruit dove, orange-bellied fruit dove, and wompoo fruit dove. Sulawesi red-knobbed hornbill serves as an effective seed disperser for C. odorata.

Uses

The essential oil is used in aromatherapy. It is believed to relieve high blood pressure and normalize sebum secretion for skin problems, and is considered to be an aphrodisiac. The oil from ylang-ylang is widely used in perfumery for oriental- or floral-themed perfumes (such as Chanel No. 5). Ylang-ylang blends well with most floral, fruit, and wood scents.

In Indonesia, ylang-ylang flowers are spread on the bed of newlywed couples. In the Philippines, its flowers, together with the flowers of the sampaguita, are strung into a necklace (lei) and worn by women and used to adorn religious images.

Ylang-ylang's essential oil makes up 29% of the Comoros' annual export (1998).

Ylang-ylang is grown in Madagascar and exported globally for its essential oils.

Ylang-ylang essential oil is one of the basic ingredients of macassar oil.

Ylang-ylang essential oil

Characteristics
The fragrance of ylang-ylang is rich and deep with notes of rubber and custard, and bright with hints of jasmine and neroli, thus it is sometimes described as heavy, sweet, and carries a slightly fruity floral scent. The essential oil of the flower is obtained through steam distillation of the flowers and separated into different grades (extra, 1, 2, or 3) according to when the distillates are obtained. The main aromatic components of ylang-ylang oil are benzyl acetate, linalool, p-cresyl methyl ether, and methyl benzoate, responsible for its characteristic odor.

Chemical constituents
Typical chemical compositions of the various grades of ylang-ylang essential oil are reported as:

 Linalool
 Germacrene
 Geranyl acetate
 Caryophyllene
 p-Cresyl methyl ether
 Methyl benzoate
 Sesquiterpenes

See also
Jasminum sambac, the Arabian jasmine, another plant widely used in perfumes

References

Further reading
Elevitch, Craig (ed.) (2006): Traditional Trees of Pacific Islands: Their Culture, Environment and Use. Permanent Agricultural Resources Publishers, Honolulu. 
Manner, Harley & Elevitch, Craig (ed.) (2006): Traditional Tree Initiative: Species Profiles for Pacific Island Agroforestry. Permanent Agricultural Resources Publishers, Honolulu.
Davis, Patricia (2000): "Aromatherapy An A-Z". Vermilion:Ebury Publishing, London.

External links

 Ylang ylang uses in perfumery

Annonaceae
Medicinal plants of Asia
Essential oils
Flora of tropical Asia
Flora of Queensland
Trees of the Philippines